Waiomys is a genus of rodents from the family Muridae. It is endemic to Sulawesi, Indonesia. The genus is monotypic, consisting of the species Waiomys mamasae (Sulawesi water rat). It is known only from Mount Gandangdewata, Mamasa Regency, West Sulawesi.

References

Mammals described in 2014
Endemic fauna of Indonesia
Rodents of Sulawesi
Monotypic rodent genera
Old World rats and mice
Rodent genera